The S6 is a railway service of RER Vaud that provides hourly service between  and  in the Swiss canton of Vaud. Swiss Federal Railways, the national railway company of Switzerland, operates the service.

Operations 
It is paired with the S5 between Allaman and Palézieux, providing half-hourly service between the two cities. Between Lausanne and Palézieux the S5 and S6 are joined by the S9, and InterRegio 15; combined there is service over the line roughly every 15 minutes. Northeast of Palézieux, the S4 operates to Romont during weekday rush-hour only.

History 

RER Vaud introduced the S6 designation with the December 2020 timetable change, replacing the S5, which was re-routed east of Lausanne to serve .

The RER Vaud lines were substantially reorganized for the December 2022 timetable change. The "new" S6 was a renaming of the former S4, making local stops between Lausanne and Palézieux.

References

External links 
 2023 timetable: Allaman–Lausanne and Lausanne–Romont

RER Vaud lines
Transport in the canton of Fribourg
Transport in the canton of Vaud